Orland Park 153rd Street is one of three stations on Metra's SouthWest Service in Orland Park, Illinois. In Metra's zone-based fare system, 153rd Street is in zone E. As of 2018, Orland Park 153rd Street is the 94th busiest of Metra's 236 non-downtown stations, with an average of 544 weekday boardings.

Unlike all other stations on the SouthWest Service (besides Union Station), tickets are sold here.

As of January 16, 2023, Orland Park 153rd Street is served by all 30 trains (15 in each direction) on weekdays. One of the outbound trains that stops at the station makes a flag stop. Saturday service is currently suspended.

References

External links 

Station from 153rd Street from Google Maps Street View

Metra stations in Illinois
Railway stations in Cook County, Illinois
153rd Street
Railway stations in the United States opened in 1990